Heydar Kola (also Romanized as Ḩeydar Kolā) is a village in Barik Rud Rural District, in the Central District of Fereydunkenar County, Mazandaran Province, Iran. At the 2006 census, its population was 491, in 127 families.

References 

Populated places in Fereydunkenar County